Falling for Figaro is a 2021 romantic comedy film written and directed by Ben Lewin, and starring Joanna Lumley, Danielle Macdonald and Hugh Skinner.

The film was screened in the 2020 Toronto International Film Festival's Industry Selects film market in September 2020, but did not have its official public premiere until 2021 due to the COVID-19 pandemic. It was released in the United States on 1 October 2021, in the United Kingdom on 22 October 2021, and in Australia on 14 July 2022.

Plot
Millie, an American fund manager, realises one day that her life-long dream is to become an opera singer. Quitting her lucrative job and moving away from her boyfriend, she travels to the Scottish Highlands where she eventually becomes an opera singer following intense vocal training from former opera diva Meghan Geoffrey-Bishop and fierce competition from other opera singers including Max, Meghan's other student.

Cast

Production and filming
Casting for Falling for Figaro began on 29 October 2019 with Joanna Lumley and Danielle Macdonald in the lead roles. On 13 December 2019, Hugh Skinner, Shazad Latif and Rebecca Benson joined the team.

Falling for Figaro was filmed in locations in the Scottish Highlands and Trossachs including Glencoe, Loch Lomond and two theatres in Glasgow. The production of the film was funded by Screen Australia, Screen Scotland and Film Victoria and took only two winter months to make (December–January). The film's post production was in Melbourne, Australia, in February.

The film includes music from many renowned operas, including The Barber of Seville, The Marriage of Figaro, Don Giovanni, Romeo and Juliet, La traviata and Carmen.

Release
Falling for Figaro was screened for industry professionals in the 2020 Toronto International Film Festival's Industry Selects section, but was not made available for viewing by the general public. It was screened at several film festivals in 2021, including the Film by the Sea Film Festival in Vlissingen, Netherlands, the Cinéfest Sudbury International Film Festival, the Berkshire International Film Festival and the Sedona Film Festival. The film also was screened in the Official Selection at the 2021 British Film Festival.

WestEnd Films announced on 24 September 2020 that distribution rights for the film had been sold to several partners in various international markets.

Falling for Figaro was released by various distributors almost all over the world. In Australia and New Zealand, the film is distributed by Umbrella Entertainment and Paramount Pictures. In Europe, film distribution rights were given to Twelve Oaks of Spain, Splendid in Benelux, Investacommerce in former Yugoslavian states, and Entertainment Film Distributors in the United Kingdom.

The US distribution rights for the film were brought by IFC Films on 7 December 2020. According to Arianna Bocco, the newly anointed president of IFC Films, the film is planned to be released in North America in 2021.

On 9 December 2020, the deal was reached between UK and other distributors. In Japan the film is scheduled to be released via Happinet, while in South Korea, Entermode will become the distributor. The distributor for Taiwan will be Central Motion Picture Corporation, while people in the Middle East will enjoy it via Phoenicia Pictures. In Europe, Nos Lusomundo will be distributor for Portugal while in Poland it will be shown on various channels including Ale Kino+, Movie Channel, Canal+ Premium and Poland Group. Canadian distribution will be by Pacific Northwest Pictures (in theatres) and Cinesky (on airlines).

Reception
On the review aggregator website Rotten Tomatoes, the film has an approval rating of 73% based on 26 critics, with an average rating of 6.5/10. On Metacritic, Falling for Figaro has a rank of 51 out of 100 from six critics, indicating "mixed or average reviews".

Frank Scheck of The Hollywood Reporter wrote "Undemanding rom-com fans and, to a lesser degree, opera lovers, should take some mild pleasure in Falling for Figaro, although the humor isn't of Gilbert and Sullivan proportions".

Guy Lodge of Variety called Falling for Figaro "A corny, cute-enough carpe diem comedy ...", while Roxana Hadadi of RogerEbert.com said "The performances are what make Falling for Figaro an entertaining distraction, even as the film plays out exactly as you would expect".

Other critics were less positive. Gary Goldstein of the Los Angeles Times wrote "It's hard to fall for Falling for Figaro". Beatrice Loayza of The New York Times admitted that "it's refreshing to see a plus-size woman not only nab the promotion and the hunky guy, but throw it all away within the first 15 minutes. Unfortunately, my plaudits for Falling for Figaro mostly end there".

References

External links

2021 romantic comedy films
2020s English-language films
Australian romantic comedy films
British romantic comedy films
Films directed by Ben Lewin
Films shot in Scotland
Madman Entertainment
Films about opera
2020s British films